HMS Hecate was a 4-gun Hydra-class paddle sloop launched on 30 March 1839 from the Chatham Dockyard.

Service
She was assigned to the Mediterranean Station between 1840 and 1843, she participated during the Syrian War of 1840. After a period of being laid in reserve she served as part of the West Africa Squadron off Africa from 1845 until 1858. On 1 January 1856, Hecate sank the American brigantine Chatsworth, which was engaged in the slave trade. Her crew survived. Later that month, she ran aground at Lagos. The steamship Puffin was subsequently wrecked during operations to salvage her guns. After being fitted out for survey operations, she was assigned to the Pacific Station in 1860, undertaking surveys along the British Columbia coast. The Hecate Strait, between the British Columbia mainland and the islands of Haida Gwaii, is named for her.  Arriving at the Australia Station in 1863, she undertook survey work in Botany Bay, Moreton Bay, the Brisbane River and Torres Strait before leaving the Australia Station in 1864.

Fate
She was paid off and sold to Castle of Charlton for breaking in 1865.

Citations

References
Bastock, John (1988), Ships on the Australia Station, Child & Associates Publishing Pty Ltd; Frenchs Forest, Australia. 

 

1839 ships
Ships built in Chatham
Paddle sloops of the Royal Navy
Maritime incidents in January 1856
Maritime incidents in August 1861